Maheba, is a village and a tehsil in Chhatarpur district in the state of Madhya Pradesh, India. It is located 3.5km from National Highway 39.

History

Chhatarpur was founded in 1785 and is named after the Bundela Rajput leader Chhatrasal, the founder of Bundelkhand independence, and contains his cenotaph. The state was ruled by his descendants until 1785. At that time the Ponwar clan of the Rajputs took control of Chhatarpur.  The state was guaranteed to Kunwar Sone Singh Ponwar in 1806 by the British Raj.
In 1854 Chhatarpur would have lapsed to the British government for want of direct heirs under the doctrine of lapse, but was conferred on Jagat Raj as a special act of grace.

In 1901 the town of Chhatarpur had a population of 10,029, a high school and manufactured paper and coarse cutlery. The state also contained the British cantonment of Nowgong.

Flora and Fauna
From National Highway 39 to village many trees of sugar-apples can be found on both sides of road. It also found in many areas of forest around the village.

Economy
There is no large scale industry in Maheba apart from agriculture .
Most depend for their livelihood on farming. This region is in a drought-affected area, so the whole place faces a water crisis for farming and potable drinking water.

Transportation
Maheba can be reach by road . Chhatarpur station started in 2017. Chhatarpur has railway station named Maharaja Chhatrasal Station Chhatarpur. The nearest railway stations are at Khajuraho (45 km), Harpalpur (55 km) Jhansi (125 km), Mauranipur (65  km) and Satna (140 km). The nearest airport is Khajuraho Civil Aerodrome, located 45 km away.

Tourism
 Gora Taal Lake, 2.8 km from village
Jagat Sagar Lake, 2.3 km from village
 Dhubela, a museum 2.6 km from Maheba
 Jatashankar, a holy place near Bijawar
 Bhimkund, a natural water tank and a holy place near Banja
 Gangau dam, a huge structure built at the confluence of two rivers, namely the Simiri River and Ken River (a prominent river of Bundelkhand), near Khajuraho, around 18 km away.
 Raneh Falls, the only waterfall in Asia having igneous rock.  It is around 17 km from Khajuraho
 Hanuman Tauria, a Hanuman temple
 Bambar Baini, Ancient temple of maa Durga on a hill in Lavkushnagar
 Panna National Park, near Panna district
 Pandav Falls, close to Khajuraho, Pandavas said to have sought shelter here during exile
 Hanuman Mandir, temple of Hanuman on a hill in Lavkushnagar

Gallery

References

Bibliography
 J. R. Ackerley, Hindoo Holiday, NYRB Classics,

External links

 Chhatarpur official website by MP Govt.
Villages in Chhatarpur district
Bundelkhand
Chhatarpur